The First Adventure (Spanish:La primera aventura) is a 1965 Mexican-Spanish adventure film directed by Tulio Demicheli and starring José Calvo, Nino Del Arco and Pedro Mari Sánchez.

Cast
 José Calvo as Cosme  
 Nino Del Arco as Child  
 Pedro Mari Sánchez as Juan  
 Marisenka Demoslawsky as Child  
 Luis Induni 
 Rafael Vaquero 
 Mercedes Barranco 
 Emilio García Domenech
 Narciso Ojeda 
 Joaquín Burgos 
 Miguel Armario 
 Valentín Tornos as School teacher  
 Roberto Cruz 
 Manuel Alexandre as Remigio

References

Bibliography
 John King & Nissa Torrents. The Garden of Forking Paths: Argentine Cinema. British Film Institute, 1988.

External links 

1965 films
Mexican adventure films
Spanish adventure films
1965 adventure films
1960s Spanish-language films
Films directed by Tulio Demicheli
1960s Spanish films
1960s Mexican films